Sheree Victoria Murphy (born 22 August 1975) is an English actress and television presenter, best known for her roles  as Dawn in Only Fools and Horses and  Tricia Dingle in the ITV soap opera Emmerdale, Eva Strong in the Channel 4 soap opera Hollyoaks and Dakota Davies in the Australian soap opera Neighbours.

In 2005, Murphy came second place in the fifth series of I'm a Celebrity...Get Me Out of Here! and competed in the 2015 series of Celebrity MasterChef. In September 2016, she became the presenter of a cookery programme on BBC One called Yes Chef!

Early life
Born in Stoke Newington, north London, Murphy was the middle child and only girl in a family of five children. The family lived in a council house, and she was educated from aged nine at the Italia Conti Academy of Theatre Arts. She then attended the Sylvia Young Theatre School.

Murphy's first part was in the musical The Rink at the Cambridge Theatre, aged 12. She did not work professionally again until Emmerdale, working her way through school from aged 14 as a hairdresser's assistant. She also worked front of house in various north London theatres.

Career
Her first TV appearance was a small but notable role as a female mugger in Only Fools and Horses 1996 Christmas episode "Heroes and Villains". She soon landed what may be her best-known role as Tricia Dingle on Emmerdale, which she played from 1998 to 2004. It was announced in late 2003 that Murphy would leave Emmerdale in December 2003, so that she could spend more time with her family and two young children, and her character was duly killed off.

Following a six-year career break to bring up her family, Murphy appeared in The Royal before winning the part of Eva Strong in Hollyoaks.

In November and December 2005, Murphy appeared on the ITV reality show I'm a Celebrity... Get Me Out of Here!, finishing second to Carol Thatcher. She was noted for being "scared of everything", and for her sweet persona; as well as embarrassing her husband Harry Kewell with comments such as "he's got a peachy bum".  Murphy presented the ITV spin-off series for series 6 with Phillip Schofield. In November 2007, she presented This Morning's coverage of the seventh series every weekday morning.

In 2005 and 2006, Murphy presented ITV2's coverage of the British Soap Awards. Murphy hosted Footballers' Cribs for MTV UK and VH1 UK, and was a regular on ITV's Loose Women (2006–2007), returning in 2012 for a single episode to celebrate 40 years of Emmerdale and a further single episode in July 2015.

In January 2007, Murphy co-hosted ITV2's Soapstar Superstar: Bonus Tracks with Mark Durden-Smith and also starred as the 'hidden' celebrity in a 2007 episode of the CBBC show Hider in the House.

Murphy joined the presenting team for Channel 5's Cowboy Builders. During the 2010 World Cup, Murphy fronted a 'World Cup Fever' campaign for Gala Bingo.

On 16 June 2014, it was announced that Murphy had joined the cast of the Australian soap opera Neighbours playing an old acquaintance of Paul Robinson called Dakota Davies.

In 2015, she participated in Celebrity MasterChef on BBC One. Since 2016, she has presented the daytime BBC One series Yes Chef!

Filmography

Personal life
Murphy is married to Australian footballer Harry Kewell. They met at the Majestyk nightclub, Leeds in 2000 and were married on 25 May 2002 in Las Vegas.

They have four children together: son, Taylor (born 2001); and daughters, Ruby (born 17 June 2003), Matilda (born 19 March 2008) and Dolly (born 14 January 2012).

Awards and nominations

References

External links

Wes & Sheree on Hits Radio

1975 births
Living people
English television actresses
English soap opera actresses
English television presenters
English expatriates in Australia
English people of Irish descent
People from Islington (district)
Alumni of the Italia Conti Academy of Theatre Arts
Alumni of the Sylvia Young Theatre School
I'm a Celebrity...Get Me Out of Here! (British TV series) participants
Association footballers' wives and girlfriends